Central City Brewers & Distillers is a Canadian brewery in Surrey, British Columbia, Canada. In 2010, their Thor's Hammer won silver in the Barley Wine-Style Ale category of the World Beer Cup awards. They released their Red Racer Low Rider Raspberry on September 25, 2017.

The company was founded in 2003 by three friends who were passionate about craft beer and wanted to create high-quality, innovative products. Central City is known for its Red Racer brand of beer, which includes a range of styles such as pale ale, IPA, and lager. In addition to beer, the company also produces a variety of spirits, including gin, vodka, and whiskey.

In addition to its brewery and distillery operations, Central City also operates a restaurant and a brewpub at its Surrey facility.

See also
 List of breweries in British Columbia

References

External links
 Official website
 Reviews

Beer brewing companies based in British Columbia
Companies based in Surrey, British Columbia